This is a list of public art in Madison County, Indiana.

This list applies only to works of public art accessible in an outdoor public space. For example, this does not include artwork visible inside a museum.  

Most of the works mentioned are sculptures. When this is not the case (e.g., sound installation,) it is stated next to the title.

Anderson

Chesterfield

Notes

Tourist attractions in Madison County, Indiana
Madison County